list of Irish Clans in the province of Ulster

Northern Uí Néill

Niall of the Nine Hostages had seven sons, two of which, Owen (Eoghan) and Conall Gulban (Conaill) traveled north from the over-kingdom of Connacht and into the northern and western regions of the over-kingdom of Ulster, an area equivalent to modern-day County Donegal.

These two became the progenitors of the two Cenél's (or kindreds) that would make up the Northern Uí Néill; the Cenél Eóghain based in Inishowen, with their capital at Ailech; and the Cenél Conaill centered in the rich area of Magh Ithe, in the valley of the river Finn. For a time the Cenél Eóghain and Cenél Conaill alternated as kings of the Northern Uí Néill until the 8th century. The Northern Uí Néill would also alternate the High-Kingship of Ireland with their southern cousins the Southern Uí Néill into the 10th century.

Cenél nEóghain

Cenél Conaill

Cianachta 

The Cianachta, or the race of Kane, also known as Clann Cian, descend from Cian, son of Oilioll Ólum, king of Munster in the 3rd century. The territory of the Cianachta spanned the present-day barony of Keenaght, which derives its name from them. By the 12th century, the Cianachta would be conquered by the Ó Cathaín.

Cianachta Glenn Geimin

The Cianachta Glenn Geimin of Clann Cian, or the Cianachta of Glengiven, ruled a region now known as Dungiven.

Síl Colla Fochríth
The Síl Colla Fochríth, descend from Colla Fochríth, the first king of Airgíalla and one of Three Collas. Clans and septs that are claimed to descend from Colla Fochríth but with no other information given include; Ui Maine, Fir Dubhshlat, Ui Conaill, and Ui Luain.

Imchad
Imchad was one of Colla Fochríth's sons, and from him son Muiredach Méth would descend the Uí Méith. The Uí Méith territory spanned northern County Louth, eastern County Armagh, and later in County Monaghan. John O'Donovan in his notes on the Annals of the Four Masters marks that there were two groups of the Ui Meith name; the Uí Méith Macha (or Uí Méith Tiri) and the Uí Méith Mara.

The Uí Méith Macha were based in the barony of Monaghan, County Monaghan. The Uí Méith Mara, meaning "Omeath by the sea", was seated in Cualigne in northern County Louth. The name Uí Méith survives as the present day name of the village Omeath.

Cenél Rochada
The Cenél Rochada are descended from Rochad, one of Colla Fochríth's sons. The following terms are noted in the Annals to describe or group the clans and septs that would descend from Rochad:

Uí Chremthainn - The Uí Chremthainn descend from Cremthann Liath, son of Fiac, son of Deig Duirn, son of Rochad. In effect the Uí Chremthainn consisted of multiple groups, part of the overall Airgíallan confederation. They ruled a territory spanning eastern Co. Fermanagh and northern Co. Monaghan.
Síl Daim Argait - The Síl Daim Argait descend from Cairpre Daim Argait, son of Echach, son of Cremthann Liath, and are thus part of the Uí Chremthainn. Prominent groups include the Sil nDaimine and Clann Lugainn of the modern county Fermanagh area. Cairpre Daim Argait had three sons; Nadsluag, Lugain, and Daimine.
Síl Duibthir - The Síl Duibthir are cited as being one of the "Trí Tuatha of Oirghialla" alongside the Uí Chremthainn and Fír Lemna. They descend from Duibthir, who in turn was descended from Cairpre Daim Argait, and are thus part of the Síl Daim Argait. The sept of Ua Laithéin are noted as chiefs of the Síl Duibthir.
Uí Briúin Archaille - The Uí Briúin Archaille (also known as "Uí Briúin ar Chaill") descend from Brian son of Deig Duirn, who was a son of Rochad. This makes him the brother of Fiac from who the Uí Chremthainn descend.  Their territory is described as being in the barony of Dungannon, Co. Tyrone.
Dál nOaich - The Dál nOaich are cited as being descended from Cremthann Liath, who is also recorded as Cremthann Oach.
Uí Labrada - The Uí Labrada descend from Labraid son of Deig Duirn, making him a brother to Brian and Fiac. Other than being noted in 1039 for slaying Murdoch mac Laverty O'Neill, the only other reference to them is the storming of their stronghold at Inis Uí Labrada by the Fir Manach.
Uí Meic Brócc - The Uí Meic Brócc descend from Echdach Amainsen, son of Cremthann Liath. Not to be confused with the Uí Meics Brócc of the County Kerry Eóganacht.
Síl nDaimine - The Sil nDaimine descend from Daimine, one of the sons of Cairpre Dam Argait, and are part of the Síl Daim Argait.

Clann Nadsluaig
The Clann Nadsluaig descend from Nadsluag, one of the sons of Cairpre Dam Argait, and part of the Síl Daim Argait. Their territory was in County Monaghan.

Clann Lugain
The Clann Lugain descend from Cormac, one of the sons of Cairpre Dam Argait, and are part of the Síl Daim Argait. Their territory was in County Fermanagh.

Clann Ceallaigh
Clann Ceallaigh descend from Cellach, son of Tuathal, king of the Uí Chremthainn, who in turn was descended from Daimine, one of the sons of Cairpre Dam Argait, and are part of the Síl Daim Argait. Clann Ceallaigh's name is preserved as the name of the modern barony of Clankelly in County Monaghan.

Fernmag
The Fernmag, or Fer Fernmaighe, is an area around Lough Ooney, aka Lock Uaithne near Smithborough in the barony of Dartry, Co. Monaghan. Immigration to south-eastern Monaghan brought the territorial name along with it, being preserved in the name of the barony of Farney. The genealogies given for the Fernmag claim they descend from Fergusa, the son of Nadsluaig, who was one of the sons of Cairpre Dam Argait.

Fír Lemna
The Fír Lemna (also known as Uí Tuathail and Síl Tuathail) are cited as being one of the "Trí Tuatha of Oirghialla" alongside the Uí Chremthainn and Síl Dubthir. Its territory is thought to have been near Clogher, Co. Tyrone. The region of Magh Lemna is given as being in the parishes of Clogher and Errigal Keerogue in southern Co. Tyrone bordering Co. Monaghan. Their ancestry is cited as being from Tuathal, a son of Daimíne, making them part of the Síl nDaimini.

Síl Fiachra Cassán
The Síl Fiachra Cassán, descend from Fiachra Cassán, a son of Colla Fochríth. Airthir (barony of Lower and Upper Orior), meaning 'east', was one of the main branches of the Síl Fiachra Cassán until the 8th century when it split into the main septs of the Uí Nialláin, the Uí Bressail, and the Uí Echdach. The territory of Airthir was centered in Ard Macha (Co. Armagh), along the eastern baronies of Orior. Some of the clans given as part of the Síl Fiachra Cassán include:

Uí Cruind
Uí Tréna - The Uí Tréna were located in Co. Armagh and claimed to be descended from Trian, son of Feidhlimidh (Phelim), son of Fiachra Cassán. Not to be confused with the Uí Tréna in Leinster or Munster.
Uí Dorthain - Also recorded as the Uí Dorthinn, Dorthaind, Dorethainn, Tortain, they are cited as being possibly near Ardbraccan, Co. Meath. They descend from Dorthon, grandson of Feidhlimidh, son of Fiachra Cassán.
Clann Sínaigh - This clan is described as being in Airthir (Orior) in County Armagh, with the genealogies showing descent from Fiachrac Cassán.

Uí Echach

The Uí Echach, or the Uí Echach Airgíalla to distinguish them from the neighbouring Uí Echach Cobo of the Dál nAraidi, are suggested as ruling an area known as Tuath Echach, comprising the barony of Armagh in County Armagh. The Uí Echach Beg and Uí Echach Mór are noted as two branches of this group, but are also placed as being in Dál nAraidi and thus maybe part of the Uí Echach Cobo. According to the books of Lecan and Ballymote, the Síl Ciarain Uí Echach were located in Airthir.

The Uí Echach descend from Echach the grandson of Fiachra Cassán.

Uí Nialláin

The Uí Nialláin, or Clan Cernaich, descend from Nialláin, son of Féicc, son of Feidelmid, who was the son of Fiachra Cassán. Their territory lay in the baronies of Oneilland East and West in Co. Armagh, which both derive their name from the Uí Nialláin rather than the O'Neills. The Airthir kings of the Uí Nialláin sept ruled from Loch gCál (modern-day Loughgall).

Uí Bresail

The Uí Bresail, also known as the Uí Bresail Airthir, ruled an area in northern Co. Armagh along the southern shore of Lough Neagh (in the barony of Oneilland East) before they were displaced by the lords of Clanbrassil, the MacCann's.

Other Clans/Septs

Fir Rois

The Fir Rois were located in the barony of Farney, County Monaghan, and in the barony of Ardee, County Louth, and in Meath. Crích Ross stands 4 miles northwest of the point where the three counties meet.

Síl Colla Uais
The Síl Colla Uais descend from Colla Uais, one of the Three Collas. Years before the Three Collas founded Airgíalla, Colla Uais ruled as king of Ireland until he and his brothers and three hundred followers were exiled to Scotland. Colla Uais had several sons including Eachach and Ercc.

Uí Meic Uais

The Uí Meic Uais descend from Ercc, a son of Colla Uais. The Uí Meic Uais are cited as having several branches;
Uí Meic Uais Mide, in the barony of Moygoaish, county Westmeath. Septs include the Ó Comhraidhe (O'Curry, Currie)
Uí Meic Uais Breg, in the barony of Upper Kells and Lower Navan, county Meath. Septs include Ó hAonghuis (O'Hennessy, Hennessy)
Yet the following are cited by Francis Byrne as being collectively known as the Uí Meic Uais, though groups of this name are also noted in the midland regions:
Uí Maic Caírthinn, south of Lough Foyle
Uí Fiachrach Arda Sratha, Ardstraw, County Tyrone
Uí Tuírtri, west and east of the Sperrings

Uí Tuírtri

The Uí Tuirtri descend from Fiachu Tort, a son of Colla Uais. Their territory was said to have included an area west of Lough Neagh as well as north-west of Lough Neagh. One of the principal chiefs of the Uí Tuírtri was the O'Lynns, who ruled from Lough Insholin, Desertmartin, County Londonderry - the name of which is preserved in the modern barony of Loughinsholin. The Uí Tuírtri territory would expand into the lands north of Lough Neagh as they were driven eastwards by the Northern Uí Néill about the 10th century. At one stage the O'Lynns ruled a territory stretching all the way to the sea deep in Ulaid territory.

Cú Muighe Ó Floinn is cited as being king of the territories of Uí Tuirtri, Fir Lí, Dál Riata, and Dál nAraidi. Muircertach mac Thomas Ó Floinn the heir aspirant was slain "treacherously" by Hugh, grandson of Aodh Buidhe Ó Néill (progenitor of the Clandeboye O'Neills), and when his father Thomas died the realm passed into the hands of the Clandeboye O'Neills.

Fir Luirg

The Fir Luirg, or men of Lurg, are listed as being among the Síl Colla Uais. By the 14th century, they were subjugated by the Maguires. Fir Luirg survives in the present-day name of the barony of Lurg, County Fermanagh.

Other Airgíallan Septs

Uí Briúin Bréifne

The Uí Briúin Bréifne, or O'Brien Breffny, are a branch of the Uí Briúin kin-group. The Uí Briúin descend from Brion, son of Eochaid Mugmedon and Mongfind, and was an elder half brother of Niall of the Nine Hostages. The traditional territory of the Uí Briúin Bréifne was known as the kingdom of Bréifne, which included the modern Irish counties of Leitrim and Cavan, along with parts of County Sligo. It is speculated that Breffny derives its name from a pre-Celtic substrate language spoken in Ireland meaning 'ring' or 'loop', therefore making Breifne one of the oldest placenames in Ireland, dating prior to 500 B.C.

The two principal families of Uí Briúin Bréifne were the O'Rourkes and O'Reillys, who after a great battle in 1256, split the kingdom into East Bréifne and West Bréifne. The kingdom of Bréifne region remained part of the kingdom of Connacht until the time of Queen Elizabeth I when it was shired into the modern counties of Cavan and Leitrim, with Leitrim remaining within Connacht and Cavan becoming part of Ulster.

Other Septs

Below is a list of other Irish septs in Ulster that can't be attached to any specific Cenél or Clann.

Notes 

All common Anglicised forms provided relate to usage in the province in Ulster and thus do not contain other Anglicised forms that relate to mirror Gaelic names from outside of Ulster. For example, the Irish name Ó Flaithbheartaigh is Anglicised as Flaherty, Flaffery and Flaverty in Connacht, however due to the aspiration of the 'F' in Ulster Irish, it is Anglicised and recorded as Laverty and Lafferty in Ulster thus the F variants have been excluded. The same for Flynn outside of Ulster, which is Lynn in Ulster.

References 

 Ireland's History in Maps - Tuath and Territory Index
 Ireland's HIstory in Maps - the Northern Ui Neill
 T.H. Mullin and J.E. Mullin (1966). "The Ulster Clans", North-West Books
 Robert Bell (1988) . "The Book of Ulster Surnames", The Black Staff Press

Irish clans
Clans